Olympique de Marseille had a disappointing season, with three managers passing by en route to a fifth-place finish in Ligue 1 and two premature domestic cup exits. With striker Didier Drogba being sold to Chelsea, and replacements Habib Bamogo and Péguy Luyindula not performing at a similar level, the goal-scoring went dry, but in spite of scoring two points less than the previous season, OM finished two positions above the previous season.

Squad

Goalkeepers
  Fabien Barthez
  Cédric Carrasso
  Jérémy Gavanon
  Pegguy Arphexad

Defenders
  Léo Matos
  Bixente Lizarazu
  Taye Taiwo
  Demetrius Ferreira
  Frédéric Déhu
  Abdoulaye Méïté
  Rémi Ribault
  Johnny Ecker
  Habib Beye
  Leyti N'Diaye
  Philippe Christanval

Midfielders
  Brahim Hemdani
  Bruno Cheyrou
  Benoît Pedretti
  Ahmed Yahiaoui
  Eduardo
  Laurent Batlles
  Samir Nasri
  Sylvain N'Diaye
  Salomon Olembé
  Koji Nakata

Attackers
  Habib Bamogo
  Péguy Luyindula
  Steve Marlet
  Koke
  Fabrice Fiorèse
  Karim Dahou

Competitions

Ligue 1

League table

Results summary

Results by round

Matches

Sources
- RSSSF - France 2004/05

Olympique de Marseille seasons
Marseille